Lloyd Odom Brown (1928-1993) was a Democratic lawyer from Ohio who was appointed to the Ohio Supreme Court.

Lloyd Brown was born in Little Rock, Arkansas on December 12, 1928. His parents were William S., Sr. & Lillie Brown. They moved to Cleveland, Ohio in 1931. William Brown died in 1940, and Lloyd worked in the pressroom of the Call and Post newspaper and at his uncle's shoe store to help support the family.

Brown was a radioman in the United States Coast Guard from 1946 to 1949. He then worked in a potato chip factory and used veteran's educational benefits to pay for education at The Ohio State University, where he received bachelor's degrees in political science and law and a juris doctor in 1955.

Brown practiced law in Cleveland in 1955 with Theodore M. Williams. In 1956 and 1957 he practiced with Cleveland City Councilman Charles V. Carr. From 1958 to 1959 he was assistant attorney general under Ohio Attorney General William B. Saxbe. He became assistant Cuyahoga County prosecuting attorney in 1959, serving until 1967.

Brown was elected judge of the Cleveland Municipal Court in 1967. In 1971, Ohio Supreme Court justice Robert Morton Duncan was appointed to the federal bench, and Brown was appointed to the vacancy by Governor John J. Gilligan. In 1972, he ran for a six-year term on the court, but lost to Paul W. Brown.

On January 12, 1973, Governor Gilligan appointed Brown to the Cuyahoga County Court of Common Pleas. He was elected to a six-year term in 1974, and re-elected in 1980, but declined to run again in 1986.

In 1984, Governor Dick Celeste appointed Brown to the Ohio Board of Regents, where he served as secretary of the board at his death in 1993. He also was a partner at Weston, Hurd, Fallon, Paisley and Howley from 1987 to 1993.

Brown died one month short of retirement on May 5, 1993. He was survived by his wife, Phyllis Brown and three children.

References

External links

1928 births
1993 deaths
Justices of the Ohio Supreme Court
Lawyers from Cleveland
Ohio Democrats
Ohio State University College of Arts and Sciences alumni
Ohio State University Moritz College of Law alumni
State cabinet secretaries of Ohio
United States Coast Guard enlisted
20th-century American judges
20th-century American lawyers